Carlo Montigli (died 1594) was a Roman Catholic prelate who served as Archbishop (Personal Title) of Viterbo e Tuscania (1576–1594), Apostolic Nuncio to Florence (1591–1592), and Archbishop of Amalfi (1570–1576).

Biography
On 20 November 1570, Carlo Montigli was appointed during the papacy of Pope Pius V as Archbishop of Amalfi.
On 13 December 1570, he was consecrated bishop by Marcantonio Bobba, Cardinal-Priest of San Silvestro in Capite, with Francesco Rusticucci, Bishop of Fano, and Annibal de Ruccellai, Bishop of Carcassonne, serving as co-consecrators. 
On 28 March 1576, he was appointed during the papacy of Pope Gregory XIII as Archbishop (Personal Title) of Viterbo e Tuscania.
On 3 August 1591, he was appointed during the papacy of Pope Gregory XIV as Apostolic Nuncio to Florence.
On 27 February 1592, he resigned as Apostolic Nuncio to Florence.
He served as Archbishop of Viterbo e Tuscania until his death on 10 April 1594.

References

External links and additional sources
 (for Chronology of Bishops) 
 (for Chronology of Bishops)  
 (for Chronology of Bishops)  

16th-century Italian Roman Catholic archbishops
Bishops appointed by Pope Pius V
Bishops appointed by Pope Gregory XIII
Bishops appointed by Pope Gregory XIV
1594 deaths
Apostolic Nuncios to the Republic of Florence